Heartbreak High, also known as The Kinky Coaches And The Pom Pom Pussycats, is a 1981 American and Canadian comedy film directed by Mark Warren. The music was composed by Richard Cooper. The film stars John Vernon, Norman Fell, Robert Forster, Thom Haverstock, Terry Swiednicki and Keith Brown in the lead roles.

Cast
 John Vernon
 Norman Fell
 Robert Forster
 Thom Haverstock
 Terry Swiednicki
 Keith Brown
 Christine Cattell
 Lisa Schwartz
 Paul Backewich
 Anthony Sherwood
 Matt Birman
 Katherine Trowell

References

External links
 

1981 films
American comedy films
Canadian comedy films
English-language Canadian films
1981 comedy films
Films shot in Montreal
Films set in Montreal
1980s English-language films
1980s American films
1980s Canadian films